Silpa Bhirasri, born Corrado Feroci (15 September 1892 – 14 May 1962), was a Tuscan-born Thai sculptor. He is considered the father of modern art in Thailand and was instrumental in the founding of today's Silpakorn University.

Life

Born in Florence, he studied at the Royal Art Academy of Florence and taught there from 1914 to 1923. Feroci was invited to Thailand in 1923 to teach Western sculpture at the Fine Arts Department of the Ministry of Palace Affairs. He was appointed as a sculptor in 1924 on a three-year contract for 800 baht per month.

In 1943, he founded what later became Silpakorn University, the University of Fine Arts.

When Italy surrendered to the Allies during World War II, Feroci changed his name and became a Thai national in 1944 to avoid arrest by the occupying Japanese army. Previously estranged from his wife in Italy, in his later years he married one of his Thai students.

Feroci / Bhirasri was the designer and sculptor of many of Bangkok's best known monuments, including Democracy Monument, Victory Monument, and the statue of King Rama I at Memorial Bridge. A Thai commemorative stamp was issued in 1992 on the centenary of his birth. His birthday, 15 September, is observed each year in Thailand as Silpa Bhirasri Day.

Death

He is buried in the Cimitero Evangelico degli Allori in the southern suburb of Florence, Galluzzo (Italy).

Tribute
In 2016, he was featured as a Google Doodle on what would have been his 124th birthday.

Partial list of works
 Democracy Monument at Phra Nakhon district, Bangkok 1939.
 Victory Monument at Ratchathewi district, Bangkok 1942.
 Prathom Rajanusorn King Rama I statue at Phra Phutta Yodfa Bridge, Bangkok 1929.
 Monument Thao Suranari in Nakhon Ratchasima 1934.
 Royal Memorial King Rama VI at Lumphini Park, Bangkok 1942.
 Monument King Naresuan the Great at Don Chedi, Suphanburi Province 1959. Sitthidet Saenghiran, Pakorn Lekson and Sanan Silakorn assisted in creation of the 1½ life size statue.

 The Royal Monument of King Taksin  Wongwian Yai, Bangkok 1950.
 Phutthamonthon, Nakhon Pathom (west of Bangkok), 1976, considered to be the tallest free-standing Buddha statue in the world.

References

Further reading
 Oscar Nalesini, L'Asia Sud-orientale nella cultura italiana. Bibliografia analitica ragionata, 1475-2005. Roma, Istituto Italiano per l'Africa e l'Oriente, 2009 (Bhirasri's articles and books on art at pp. 292–316) .

External links
 History of Thai postage stamps
 Thai Artists
  Silpakorn University Journal biography of Silpa Bhirasri

1892 births
1962 deaths
Silpa Bhirasri
Silpa Bhirasri
20th-century Italian sculptors
Italian male sculptors
Silpa Bhirasri
Silpa Bhirasri
Silpa Bhirasri
20th-century Italian male artists